Saltuarius kateae, also known commonly as Kate's leaf-tailed gecko or the Mount Marsh leaf-tailed gecko is a species of gecko, a lizard in the family Carphodactylidae. The species is native to New South Wales.

Etymology
The specific name, kateae, is in honor of Kate Couper, wife of the senior author of the original description of this species.

Geographic range
S. kateae is endemic to the southern end of the Richmond Range in New South Wales. This area was severely affected by the 2019-2020 Australian megafires, with over 80% of the available habitat burned.

References

Further reading
Cogger HG (2014). Reptiles and Amphibians of Australia, Seventh Edition. Clayton, Victoria, Australia: CSIRO Publishing. xxx + 1,033 pp. .
Wilson, Steve; Swan, Gerry (2013). A Complete Guide to Reptiles of Australia, Fourth Edition. Sydney: New Holland Publishers. 522 pp. .

Saltuarius
Geckos of Australia
Endemic fauna of Australia
Reptiles described in 2008
Taxa named by Patrick J. Couper
Taxa named by Ross Allen Sadlier
Taxa named by Glenn Michael Shea
Taxa named by Jessica Worthington Wilmer